A Chorus Line is a 1975 musical with music by Marvin Hamlisch, lyrics by Edward Kleban, and a book by James Kirkwood Jr. and Nicholas Dante.

Set on the bare stage of a Broadway theater, the musical is centered on seventeen Broadway dancers auditioning for spots on a chorus line. A Chorus Line provides a glimpse into the personalities of the performers and the choreographer, as they describe the events that have shaped their lives and their decisions to become dancers.

Following several workshops and an Off-Broadway production, A Chorus Line opened at the Shubert Theatre on Broadway July 25, 1975, directed by Michael Bennett and co-choreographed by Bennett and Bob Avian. An unprecedented box office and critical hit, the musical received twelve Tony Award nominations and won nine, in addition to the 1976 Pulitzer Prize for Drama.

The original Broadway production ran for 6,137 performances, becoming the longest-running production in Broadway history until surpassed by Cats in 1997, and the longest-running Broadway musical originally produced in the US, until surpassed in 2011 by the revival of Chicago. It remains the seventh longest-running Broadway show ever. A Chorus Lines success has spawned many successful productions worldwide. It began a lengthy run in the West End in 1976 and was revived on Broadway in 2006, and in the West End in 2013.

Synopsis
The show opens during an audition for an upcoming Broadway production. The formidable director Zach and his assistant choreographer Larry put the 24 dancers through their paces. Every dancer is desperate for work ("I Hope I Get It"). After a round of cuts, 17 dancers remain. Zach tells them he is looking for a strong 8-member dancing chorus of four boys and four girls.  Wanting to learn more about them, he asks the dancers to introduce themselves. Reluctantly, the dancers reveal their pasts. The stories generally progress chronologically from early life experiences through adulthood to the end of a career.

The first candidate, Mike Costa, explains that he is the youngest of 12 children. He recalls his first experience with dance, watching his sister Rosalie's dance class when he was a preschooler ("I Can Do That"). Mike replaced her one day when she refused to go to class—and he stayed. Bobby Mills tries to hide his unhappy childhood by making jokes. As he speaks, the other dancers distrust this strange audition process and debate what they should reveal to Zach ("And..."), but since they all need the job, the session continues.

Zach is angered that the streetwise Sheila Bryant is seemingly not taking the audition seriously. Opening up, she reveals that her mother married at a young age and her father neither cared about nor loved them. At age six she realized, as had fellow auditionees Bebe Benzenheimer and Maggie Winslow, that ballet helped her escape her unhappy family life ("At the Ballet"). Scatterbrained and tone-deaf Kristine Urich-DeLuca laments being unable to sing, while her husband Al finishes her phrases in tune ("Sing").

Mark Anthony, the youngest dancer, relates his first exposure to the female anatomy and his first wet dream, while the other dancers share their own memories of adolescence ("Hello Twelve, Hello Thirteen, Hello Love"). The 4'10" Connie Wong laments the problems of being short, and Diana Morales recollects her horrible high school acting class ("Nothing"). Don Kerr remembers his first job at a nightclub and Judy Turner reflects on her problematic childhood while some auditioners talk about their parents' opinions ("Mother"). Greg Gardner discusses discovering his homosexuality and Richie Walters recounts nearly becoming a kindergarten teacher ("Gimme the Ball"). Finally, the newly-buxom Val Clark explains that talent alone isn't everything, and silicone and plastic surgery can really help improve one's image and career prospects ("Dance: Ten; Looks: Three").

The dancers go downstairs to learn a song for the audition's next section, but experienced dancer Cassie Ferguson, who has had notable successes as a soloist, stays onstage to talk to Zach. They have a history together: Zach had previously cast her in a featured part, and they had lived together for several years. Zach tells Cassie that she is too good for the chorus and shouldn't be at this audition. However, she explains her current inability to find solo work and is willing to "come home" to the chorus where she can at least express her passion for dance ("The Music and the Mirror"). Zach relents and sends her downstairs to learn the dance combination.

Zach calls Paul San Marco, who has been reluctant to share his past, onstage for a private talk, and he emotionally relives his childhood and teenage years, his early career in a drag act, facing his manhood and his homosexuality, and his parents ultimately discovering his lifestyle and disowning him for it, before breaking down, with Zach comforting him. Cassie and Zach's complex relationship resurfaces during a run-through of the number created to showcase an unnamed star ("One"). Zach confronts Cassie, feeling that she is "dancing down," and they rehash the issues in their relationship and her career. Zach points to the machine-like movement of the other dancers, who have all blended together and will probably never be recognized individually, and mockingly asks if she wants this. Cassie defiantly defends the dancers: "I’d be proud to be one of them. They’re wonderful....They’re all special. I’d be happy to be dancing in that line. Yes, I would...and I'll take chorus...if you'll take me."

During a tap sequence, Paul falls and injures his knee that recently underwent surgery. After Paul is carried off to the hospital, all at the audition stand in disbelief, realizing that their careers can also end in an instant. Zach asks the remaining dancers what they will do when they can no longer dance. Diana leads the company in "What I Did for Love".The final eight dancers are selected: Mike, Cassie, Bobby, Judy, Richie, Val, Mark, and Diana.

"One" (reprise/finale) begins with an individual bow for each of the 19 characters, their hodgepodge rehearsal clothes replaced by identical spangled gold costumes. As each dancer joins the group, it is suddenly difficult to distinguish one from the other: ironically, each character who was an individual to the audience seems now to be an anonymous member of a never-ending ensemble.

Musical numbers
 "I Hope I Get It" – Company
 "I Can Do That" – Mike
 "And..." – Bobby, Richie, Val, and Judy
 "At the Ballet" – Sheila, Bebe, and Maggie
 "Sing!" – Kristine, Al, and Company
 "Montage Part 1: Hello Twelve, Hello Thirteen, Hello Love" – Mark, Connie, and Company
 "Montage Part 2: Nothing" – Diana
 "Montage Part 3: Mother" – Don, Judy, Maggie, and Company
 "Montage Part 4: Gimme the Ball" – Greg, Richie, and Company
 "Dance: Ten; Looks: Three" – Val
 "The Music and the Mirror" – Cassie
 "One" – Company
 "The Tap Combination" – Company
 "What I Did for Love" – Diana and Company 
 "One (Reprise)/Finale" – Company

Original cast album
Issued by Columbia Records (PS33581) containing the following tracks:

Side One
 "I Hope I Get It" – Company
 "I Can Do That" – Mike (Wayne Cilento)
 "At the Ballet" – Sheila (Kelly Bishop), Bebe (Nancy Lane), Maggie (Kay Cole)
 "Sing!" – Kristine (Renee Baughman), Al (Don Percassi)
 "Hello Twelve, Hello Thirteen, Hello Love" (Montage) – Company
 "Nothing" – Diana (Priscilla Lopez)

Side Two
 "The Music and the Mirror" – Cassie (Donna McKechnie)
 "Dance: Ten; Looks: Three" – Val (Pamela Blair)
 "One" – Company
 "What I Did For Love" – Diana and Company 
 "One (Reprise)/Finale" – Company

Charts

Notable casts

Notes

Characters 
 Zach – The imperious, successful director running the audition
 Larry – Zach's assistant

The Auditionees
 Don Kerr (#5) – A married man who once worked in a strip club
 Maggie Winslow (#9) – A sweet woman who grew up in a broken home
 Mike Costa (#81) – An aggressive dancer who learned to tap at an early age
 Connie Wong (#149) – A petite Chinese-American who seems ageless
 Greg Gardner (#67) – A sassy Jewish gay man who divulges his first experience with a woman
 Cassie Ferguson – A once successful solo dancer down on her luck and a former love of Zach's
 Sheila Bryant (#152) – A sassy, sexy, aging dancer who tells of her unhappy childhood.
 Bobby Mills (#84) – Sheila's best friend who jokes about his conservative upbringing in Buffalo, New York
 Bebe Benzenheimer (#37) – A young dancer who only feels beautiful when she dances
 Judy Turner (#23) – A tall, gawky, and quirky dancer
 Richie Walters (#44) – An enthusiastic black man who once planned to be a kindergarten teacher
 Al DeLuca (#17) – An Italian-American who takes care of his wife
 Kristine Urich-DeLuca (#10) – Al's scatterbrained wife who can't sing
 Val Clark (#179) – A foul-mouthed but excellent dancer who couldn't get performing jobs because of her looks until she had plastic surgery
 Mark Anthony (#63) – The youngest dancer, who recounts the time he told his priest he thought he had gonorrhea
 Paul San Marco (#45) – A gay Puerto Rican who dropped out of high school and survived a troubled childhood
 Diana Morales  (#2) – Paul's friend, another Puerto Rican who was underestimated by her teachers

Cut Dancers
 Tricia (#131) – A dancer who prays for a job
 Vicki (#60) – A dancer who's never studied ballet
 Lois (#63) – A dancer who excels in ballet
 Roy (#36) – A dancer who can't seem to get the right arms for the dance
 Butch (#14) – A dancer who gives attitude in the audition
 Tom (#40) – A dancer who is also an all-American jock
 Frank (#59) – A dancer who keeps looking at his feet

Production history
The musical was formed from several taped workshop sessions with Broadway dancers, known as "gypsies," including eight who eventually appeared in the original cast. The sessions were originally hosted by dancers Michon Peacock and Tony Stevens.  The first taped session occurred at the Nickolaus Exercise Center on January 26, 1974.  They hoped that they would form a professional dance company to make workshops for Broadway dancers.

Michael Bennett was invited to join the group primarily as an observer, but quickly took control of the proceedings. Although Bennett's involvement has been challenged, there has been no question about Kirkwood and Dante's authorship. In later years, Bennett's claim that A Chorus Line had been his brainchild resulted not only in hard feelings but a number of lawsuits as well. During the workshop sessions, random characters would be chosen at the end for the chorus jobs based on their performance quality, resulting in a different "cast" being selected every run-through.  However, several of the costumers objected to this ending, citing the stress of having to change random actors in time for the finale. This resulted in the ending being cut in exchange for the same set of characters being "cast." Marvin Hamlisch, who wrote A Chorus Lines score, recalled how, during the first previews, audiences seemed put off by something in the story. This problem was solved when actress Marsha Mason told Bennett that Cassie (Donna McKechnie in the original production) should win the part in the end because she did everything right. Bennett changed it so that Cassie would always win the part.

Original production
A Chorus Line opened Off-Broadway at The Public Theater on April 15, 1975. At the time, the Public did not have enough money to finance the production so it borrowed $1.6 million to produce the show.  The show was directed by Bennett and co-choreographed by Bennett and Bob Avian. Advance word had created such a demand for tickets that the entire run sold out immediately. Producer Joseph Papp moved the production to Broadway and on July 25, 1975, it opened at the Shubert Theatre, where it ran for 6,137 performances until April 28, 1990.

Additional cast members Carole Schweid and John Mineo were understudies named "Barbara" and "Jarad", although they only went on covering other roles. Also, Tim Cassidy was an understudy for "Bobby".

The production was nominated for 12 Tony Awards, winning nine: Best Musical, Best Musical Book, Best Score (Hamlisch and Kleban), Best Director, and Best Choreography, Best Actress (McKechnie), Best Featured Actor (Sammy Williams), Best Featured Actress (Bishop) and Best Lighting Design.  The show won the 1976 Pulitzer Prize for Drama, one of the few musicals ever to receive this honor, and the New York Drama Critics' Circle Award for Best Play of the season.

In 1976, many of the original cast went on to perform in San Francisco. Open roles were recast and the play was again reviewed as the "New" New York Company which included Ann Reinking, Sandahl Bergman, Christopher Chadman, Justin Ross (who would go on to appear in the film), and Barbara Luna.

When it closed, A Chorus Line was the longest running show in Broadway history until its record was surpassed by Cats in 1997. On September 29, 1983, Bennett and 332 A Chorus Line veterans gathered to celebrate the musical becoming the longest-running show in Broadway history.

Up to February 19, 1990, A Chorus Line had generated $146 million from its Broadway gross and $277 million in total U.S. grosses and had 6.5 million Broadway attendees. At the time, it was the second most profitable show in Broadway history after Cats with profits of $50 million (including ancillary income). 75% of the profits went to Papp's New York Shakespeare Festival and 25% to Bennett's Plum Productions. Since its inception, the show's many worldwide productions, both professional and amateur, have been a major source of income for The Public Theater that Papp had founded.

Subsequent productions
U.S. and international tours were mounted in 1976, including a sit-down engagement in Los Angeles at the Shubert Theatre.

A London production opened in the West End at the Theatre Royal Drury Lane in 1976, initially with the International Cast from the US, including Jane Summerhays as Sheila. The production ran for three years and won the Laurence Olivier Award as Best Musical of the Year in 1976, the first year the awards were presented. The original British cast took over in 1977. It included Jean-Pierre Cassel as Zach, Diane Langton as Diana Morales, Jeff Shankley as Al, Michael Staniforth as Paul, Stephen Tate as Greg (later replacing Cassel as Zach) and Geraldine Gardner (aka Trudi van Doorn of The Benny Hill Show) as Sheila. Elizabeth Seal was cast as Cassie but was replaced at the eleventh hour by her understudy Petra Siniawski who played the role for the entire British cast run.

The original Australian production opened in Sydney at Her Majesty's Theatre in May 1977 and moved to Melbourne's Her Majesty's Theatre in January 1978. The cast featured Peta Toppano as Diana, David Atkins as Mike, and Ross Coleman as Paul.

In 1980, under the direction of Roy Smith, the Teatro El Nacional of Buenos Aires produced a Spanish version of A Chorus Line lasting 10 months (and then only to make way for an already scheduled subsequent production).

In Spain the show opened in December 1984 at Teatre Tívoli in Barcelona, directed by Roy Smith and translated into Spanish by Nacho Artime and Jaime Azpilicueta, before transferring to Teatro Monumental in Madrid.

In July 1986, A Chorus Line was produced in Italy for the first time. It premiered at the Nervi Festival of Dance in Genoa, followed by a five-week Italian tour. The choreography was adapted for the festival's performing space by Baayork Lee who had played Connie in the original production and subsequently became a close collaborator of Michael Bennett, the original choreographer.

The German-language version was again directed by Lee and first opened in 1987 in Vienna, Austria, where it ran for one season  followed by the German-language CD release produced by Jimmy Bowien in 1988.

The first—and as of 2016 only—professional Hungarian production of the musical opened its limited run on March 25, 1988, under the title  (In Memory of Michael Bennett). It was performed by Ódry Színpad (the company of the Academy of Drama and Film in Budapest) translated into Hungarian by György Gebora, and directed by Imre Kerényi. The character Zach was renamed Michael and played by Kerényi.

The 2006 Broadway revival opened at the Gerald Schoenfeld Theater on October 5, 2006, following a run in San Francisco. The revival closed on August 17, 2008, after 759 performances and 18 previews. It cost $8 million to finance and recouped its investment in 19 weeks.  The production was directed by Bob Avian, with the choreography reconstructed by Baayork Lee, who had played Connie Wong in the original Broadway production. The opening night cast included Paul McGill, Michael Berresse, Charlotte d'Amboise, Mara Davi, James T. Lane, Tony Yazbeck, Heather Parcells,  Alisan Porter, Jason Tam, Jessica Lee Goldyn, Deidre Goodwin, and Chryssie Whitehead.  On April 15, 2008, Mario Lopez joined the cast as the replacement for Zach. The production was the subject of the documentary film Every Little Step.

The production received two Tony Award nominations in 2007 for Featured Role (Charlotte d'Amboise) and Revival (Musical). The original contract for A Chorus Line provided for sharing the revenue from the show with the directors and dancers that had attended the original workshop sessions.  However, the contract did not specify revenue when the musical was revived in 2006. In February 2008, an agreement was reached between the dancers and Michael Bennett's estate.

A 2008 U.S. touring production opened on May 4, 2008, at the Denver Center for the Performing Arts and toured through June 2009. This production featured Michael Gruber as Zach, Nikki Snelson as Cassie, Emily Fletcher as Sheila, and Gabrielle Ruiz as Diana.

In 2012, the musical toured Australia, gaining much critical acclaim. Baayork Lee directed the production and it gained many nominations, including Helpmann nominations for Best Actress in a Musical for West End star, Anita Louise Combe playing Cassie, Best supporting Actress in a musical, Deborah Krizak and Best supporting Actor in a musical, Euan Doidge and it won best musical.  The same production and cast then came to Singapore, playing at the Marina Bay Sands, Sands Theater from May 4 to 27, 2012.

The show returned to London for a West End revival in February 2013 at the London Palladium, running through August of that year. It was directed by original choreographer Bob Avian, with John Partridge, Scarlett Strallen, and Victoria Hamilton-Barritt starring. James T. Lane is reprising his Broadway role and Leigh Zimmerman won the Laurence Olivier Award for Best Performance in a Supporting Role in a Musical for her portrayal of Sheila in this production. Producers announced on June 9, 2013, that the London revival cast would record a new cast album featuring never-before-heard songs which were written for the show but never made the final cut.

In 2015, the Original Broadway cast of Hamilton paid tribute to A Chorus Line 40th anniversary and performed "What I Did For Love", with the original cast of A Chorus Line joining them onstage.

Reports surfaced in June 2016 that a second Broadway revival is planned for 2025, in honor of the show's 50th anniversary.

In 2016, approval was granted to director Donna Feore to allow changes in choreography so the show could be performed for the first time on a thrust stage, in the Festival Theatre at the Stratford Festival of Canada.

In 2018, New York City Center presented A Chorus Line as their annual gala presentation. The production was directed by Bob Avian, co-choreographer of the original 1975 production, and choreographed by Baayork Lee, Broadway's original Connie Wong.

In 2019, a Spanish-language version of the musical premiered as part of the inaugural season of Teatro del Soho in Málaga, Spain, starring the theater's founder Antonio Banderas as Zach. Banderas also co-directed the musical with Baayork Lee.

Awards and nominations

Original Broadway production

Original London production

2006 Broadway revival

2012 Australian  revival

2013 London revival

Film adaptation 

In 1975, the rights for a film were sold to Universal Pictures for $5.5 million plus 20% of the distributor's gross rentals above $30 million. Universal subsequently sold the rights to PolyGram. The film was released in 1985, starring Michael Douglas as Zach. It also featured Alyson Reed and Terrance Mann as Cassie and Larry respectively. The film was directed by Richard Attenborough with a screenplay by Arnold Schulman. It was produced by Cy Feuer and distributed by Columbia Pictures, Metro-Goldwyn-Mayer, and Universal Pictures. The film received mixed  reviews from critics and was a box office bomb, grossing only $14 million from a $25 million budget. Songs "Montage Part 1: Hello Twelve, Hello Thirteen, Hello Love" and "Montage Part 4: Gimme The Ball" were cut and replaced with "Surprise, Surprise", a new song written by Marvin Hamlisch and Edward Kleban. "The Music and the Mirror" was also cut and replaced with "Let me dance for you" written by Hamlisch and Kleban. "What I Did for Love" was sung by Cassie instead of Diana and was sung as a counterpart during "The Tap Combination." Songs "And...",  and "Sing!" were cut entirely.

As Kelly Bishop, who played Sheila in the original Broadway cast, later noted, "it was appalling when director Richard Attenborough went on a talk show and said 'this is a story about kids trying to break into show business.' I almost tossed my TV out the window; I mean what an idiot! It's about veteran dancers looking for one last job before it's too late for them to dance anymore. No wonder the film sucked!"

In popular culture

In 1976, "One" and "What I Did For Love" were performed by the cast of The Brady Bunch Variety Hour.

In 1988, the 60th Academy Awards featured a variation of "I Hope I Get It" at the beginning of the ceremony.

In 1990, original cast members Baayork Lee and Thommie Walsh collaborated with Robert Viagas on the book On the Line: The Creation of A Chorus Line, which chronicles the musical's origins and evolution and includes interviews with the entire original cast.

In 1990, Visa launched a marketing campaign around A Chorus Line as it was touring the United States. The promotions included television commercials featuring the musical and the right to say that tickets for the show could be charged only on Visa cards. Visa paid $500,000 for the promotion.

Also in 1990, much of the original cast reunited to perform selections from the musical as well as talk about it on the talk show Donahue. This performance was given to benefit the final run of the show as it was about to close on Broadway at the time. The highlight of the appearance was an emotionally charged performance of "At The Ballet" as performed by Kelly Bishop, Kay Cole and Nancy Lane which left several of the cast and the studio audience fighting back tears. Another highlight was the comical performance of "Dance: Ten, Looks: Three (Tits and Ass)" as done by Pamela Blair. Renee Baughman was the only original cast member who couldn't attend the show's taping because she had to care for her seriously ill father.

The Simpsons episode "Treehouse of Horror V" closes with a parody of "One", which the Simpson family and Groundskeeper Willie sing (with alternate lyrics) after they are turned inside out by a mysterious fog.

Figure skater Oksana Baiul performed to One en route to defeating Nancy Kerrigan at the 1994 Olympics.

Michael Bennett and Ed Kleban are portrayed in the 2001 musical A Class Act, a partly fictionalized account of Kleban's life using some of the lyricist's unpublished songs.

In "What I'll Never Do For Love Again," the 20th episode of the fifth season of Ally McBeal (2002), Elaine Vassal auditions (ultimately in vain) for a Boston production of A Chorus Line, singing "Dance: Ten; Looks: Three" and "The Music and the Mirror."

James D. Stern and Adam Del Deo produced and directed a documentary film about the musical called Every Little Step, which includes footage of Michael Bennett and interviews with Marvin Hamlisch, Bob Avian, former theater critic for The New York Times Frank Rich, and original cast members Donna McKechnie and Baayork Lee. The film includes some of the audiotapes made at the early workshop sessions and shows behind-the-scenes footage of the audition, rehearsals, and performances of both the original 1975 production and the 2006 Broadway revival. Production of the documentary began in 2005 when 3,000 hopefuls arrived on the first day of auditions for the revival. The film made its world premiere at the Toronto International Film Festival in September 2008 and was released as Broadway Broadway in Japan the following month. The documentary opened in limited release in the US in April 2009.

In 2009, music from the score was used in the television series Fringe in the episode "Brown Betty", and also in the movie Land of the Lost that same year featuring Will Ferrell, Danny McBride, and Anna Friel

The song "What I Did for Love" has been recorded by Aretha Franklin on Sweet Passion (1977), Petula Clark, The Three Degrees on their 1977 album Standing Up for Love, Me First and the Gimme Gimmes on Are a Drag (1999), Christine Ebersole in a 2009 episode of The Colbert Report, and most recently by Lea Michele in the first episode of the second season of the hit musical television series Glee. In a later episode in the same season, Jenna Ushkowitz and Harry Shum Jr. performed "Sing!", although the male and female vocals were switched. The episode "Hell-O" from the show's first season was planned to feature a performance of "Hello Twelve, Hello Thirteen, Hello Love", although the performance was cut; in a later episode the song can be heard playing in the background. Never officially released, the song was performed by Lea Michele and Jonathan Groff. "At The Ballet" was featured in the show's fourth season and was performed by Chris Colfer, Naya Rivera, Lea Michele and Sarah Jessica Parker.

The South Park episode "W.T.F." features a scene that opens with the piano intro for "One" followed by a parody of "Nothing".

The Scrubs episode "My Malpractical Decision" features a parody of "One", accompanying an imaginary sequence in which Neena Broderick repeatedly assaults a barrage of unfortunate bystanders in the genitals.

In the House MD Season 6 episode "The Down Low", James Wilson (Robert Sean Leonard) starts singing "One" in the last few seconds of the episode, much to the discomfort of Wilson's best friend, Gregory House (Hugh Laurie).

In August 2013, ACL alumna Melissa R. Randel ("Judy Turner") mounted her original production The Hat at The New York International Fringe Festival – FringeNYC. The Hat was inspired by her experience as a young Broadway dancer who learns on the eve of a performance that her father has died. Randel appeared in more than 2,000 performances of the musical from 1981 to 1985 at Broadway's Shubert Theatre and on National and international tours, and can be seen as a featured dancer in Richard Attenborough's film adaptation of A Chorus Line.

See also

Notes

References
 Long, Robert Emmet, Broadway, the Golden Years. Continuum International Publishing Group 2001. 
 Flinn, Denny Martin, What They Did for Love: The Untold Story Behind the Making of A Chorus Line. Bantam 1989 
 Hamlisch, Marvin, The Way I Was. Scribner 1982. 
 Kelly, Kevin, One Singular Sensation: The Michael Bennett Story. New York: Doubleday 1990. 
 Mandelbaum, Ken, A Chorus Line and the Musicals of Michael Bennett. St. Martins Press 1990. 
 McKechnie, Donna and Lawrence, Greg, Time Steps: My Musical Comedy Life. Simon & Schuster 2006. 
 Stevens, Gary, The Longest Line: Broadway's Most Singular Sensation: A Chorus Line. Applause Books 2000. 
 Viagas, Robert; Lee, Baayork; and Walsh, Thommie, On the Line: The Creation of A Chorus Line. New York: William Morrow & Company 1990.

External links
 
 Every Little Step film website
 
 
 Tony Award Winners and Nominations 1976

1975 musicals
Broadway musicals
LGBT-related musicals
West End musicals
Off-Broadway musicals
Laurence Olivier Award-winning musicals
Original musicals
Plays set in the United States
Pulitzer Prize for Drama-winning works
One-act musicals
Pulitzer Prize for Drama-winning musicals
Plays set in New York City
Tony Award for Best Musical
Works set in theatres
Musicals by Marvin Hamlisch
Tony Award-winning musicals
Backstage musicals
Plays about actors